Brisaster kerguelenensis is a species of sea urchins of the family Schizasteridae. Their armour is covered with spines. Brisaster kerguelenensis was first scientifically described in 1917 by Hubert Lyman Clark.

References 

Brisaster